The Foreigner is a crime thriller, the first novel by the author Francie Lin. The novel was published on May 27, 2008, and won the 2009 Edgar Award for Best First Novel.

References

2008 novels
American crime novels
American thriller novels
2008 debut novels